The Murder of al-Nafs al-Zakiyya  (Arabic: قتل النفس الزكية, Persian: قتل نفس زکیه), is the murder of the Pure Soul in advance of the rise of the Mahdi.

Nafs-e Zakiyyah's story has been told in Islamic narrations (mostly in Shia hadiths). Allegedly it would transpire 15 days before al-Mahdi's rising in al-Masjid al-Haram.

Nafs al-Zakiyya is either the son of Husayn ibn Ali;  (or, from Hassani Sayyids based on some narrations). He will be killed in Mecca, between Rokn and Maqam.

Sign of reappearance 
“Five signs will become manifest before the reappearance of the Qaim: Advent of Yamani and Sufyani, call from the sky, the sinking of Baida land and the killing of the Pure Soul (Nafse Zakiyyah).”

References 

Death predictions
Islamic eschatology
Murder in Saudi Arabia
Shia eschatology
Shia Islam
Shia imams
Mahdism